James Potter (April 7, 1864 – April 15, 1934) was an American businessman who served as president of the Philadelphia Phillies from 1903 to 1904.

Early life
Potter was born in Savannah, Georgia on April 7, 1864 to John Hamilton and Alice Beirne (Steimbergen) Potter. His father was a United States Civil War veteran who served with the Confederate States Army. Potter was educated in Baltimore and at St. Paul's School in Concord, New Hampshire. He attended Princeton University, but left after his junior year. On June 4, 1885 he married Elizabeth Perkins Sturgis. They had three children; Elizabeth Sturgis, John Hamilton, and Robert Sturgis Porter. On January 27, 1908, Elizabeth Sturgis Porter married Frank Polk.

Business career
From 1888 to 1899, Potter worked for the Baltimore and Ohio Railroad, where he rose to the position of Division Passenger Agent. He then entered the newspaper business as general manager of the Philadelphia Evening Telegraph. He then managed the Philadelphia branch of Marshall, Spader, & Co., a stock brokerage firm. In 1908, Marshall, Spader, & Co. closed their Philadelphia office and Potter took over management of the Public Ledger. From 1913 until his death in 1934 he was a general agent for the Cunard Line.

Sports
Potter won championships in both racquets and court tennis. He helped organize the Racquet Club of Philadelphia and was the club's president for its first 17 years of existence.

In 1903, Potter led a syndicate that purchased the Philadelphia Phillies from Al Reach & John Rogers. On March 3, 1903, Potter was elected president of the club. On November 30, 1904 he was succeeded as president by Bill Shettsline. On February 23, 1909, Potter sold his shares to Israel Wilson Durham.

References

1864 births
1934 deaths
American newspaper executives
American stockbrokers
American transportation businesspeople
Baltimore and Ohio Railroad people
Major League Baseball owners
People from Savannah, Georgia
Philadelphia Phillies owners
Sportspeople from Philadelphia
St. Paul's School (New Hampshire) alumni
People born in the Confederate States